Hans Elis "Hasse" Johansson (born 23 April 1962) is a former bandy player from Sweden and current coach of the Chinese national team.

Career

Club career
Starting with youth bandy in Edsbyns IF, Johansson made his senior debut for the team in 1978 and played six seasons until he joined Västerås SK in 1984. Johansson won the Swedish Championship four times with Västerås in 1989, 1990, 1993 and 1996. In total, he scored 13 goals in the final games, a club record for Västerås.

On 30 November 1988, Johansson scored club-best eight goals for Västerås in a game ending 14–2 against Västanfors .
On 20 November 1996, Johansson scored the then-fastest goal in Swedish bandy, when he scored for Västerås against Edsbyn after eight seconds (this goal is now the second fastest in Swedish elite bandy).
Johansson has scored club-record 13 goals in the finals.

In 1997, Johansson joined Yenisey. With his spell in Yenisey, Johansson became the first Swedish player to play professionally in Russia.

International career
Johansson was part of Swedish World Champions teams of 1983, 1987, 1993 and 1995

Honours

Country 
 Sweden
 Bandy World Championship: 1983, 1987, 1993, 1995

References

External links
 

1962 births
Living people
Swedish bandy players
Expatriate bandy players in Russia
Edsbyns IF players
Västerås SK Bandy players
Yenisey Krasnoyarsk players
Sweden international bandy players
Bandy World Championship-winning players